

Belgium
 Congo Free State 
 Camille Janssen, Governor-General of the Congo Free State (1886–1891)
 Herman Ledeganck, acting Governor-General of the Congo Free State (1888–1889)

France
 French Somaliland – Léonce Lagarde, Governor of French Somaliland (1888–1899)
 Riviéres du Sud – Jean-Marie Bayol, Lieutenant-Governor of Riviéres du Sud (1882–1891)

Portugal
 Angola – Gilherme Auguste de Brito Capelo, Governor-General of Angola (1886–1892)

United Kingdom
 British Virgin Islands – Edward John Cameron, Administrator of the British Virgin Islands (1887–1894)
 Falkland Islands – Thomas Kerr, Governor of the Falkland Islands (1887–1891)
 Lagos Colony -
 Malta Colony – Henry Torrens, Governor of Malta (1888–1889)
 New South Wales – Charles Wynn-Carington, Lord Lincolnshire, Governor of New South Wales (1885–1890)
 Queensland – Field Marshal Sir Henry Norman, Governor of Queensland (1889–1895)
 Tasmania – Robert Hamilton, Governor of Tasmania (1887–1892)
 South Australia 
 Sir William Robinson, Governor of SouthAustralia (1883–1889)
 Algernon Keith-Falconer, Lord Kintore, Governor of South Australia (1889–1895)
 Victoria 
 Henry, Lord Loch, Governor of Victoria (1884–1889)
 John Hope, Earl of Hopetoun, Governor of Victoria (1889–1895)
 Western Australia – Sir Frederick Broome, Governor of Western Australia (1883–1890)

Colonial governors
Colonial governors
1889